Aurecocrypta is a genus of Australian brushed trapdoor spiders first described by Robert Raven in 1994.  it contains only two species.

References

Barychelidae
Mygalomorphae genera
Spiders of Australia